Lovelines is a 1984 American comedy film directed by Rod Amateau and written by Chip Hand and William Byron Hillman. The film stars Greg Bradford, Mary Beth Evans, Michael Winslow, Don Michael Paul and Tammy Taylor. The film was released on November 2, 1984. by Tri-Star Pictures.

Plot
The annual battle of the bands is raging. Two rival high schools, Malibu High School and Coldwater Canyon High, have two hot bands; The Firecats and Racer. When the lead singers of both bands, Piper (Mary Beth Evans) and Rick (Greg Bradford), meet, they fall in love with each other and have to fight realities such as peer pressure, the fact they attend rival high schools and even Piper's older brother, Godzilla (Frank Zagarino), try to stop their love from getting stronger. The telephone service called Lovelines, run by J.D. Prescott (Michael Winslow), is right in the middle to help the two stay in love with each other and is also sponsoring the annual battle of the bands where their bands are competing with each other. It all comes down to a masquerade party where everyone from both schools learn that true love does indeed conquer all.

Cast 
 Greg Bradford as Rick Johnson
 Mary Beth Evans as Piper
 Michael Winslow as J.D.
 Don Michael Paul as Jeff
 Tammy Taylor as Priscilla
 Stacey Toten as Cynthia
 Robert DeLapp as The Beagle
 Frank Zagarino as Godzilla
 Todd Bryant as Hammer
 Jonna Lee as Lisa
Robin Watkins as Theresa
 Claudia Cowan as Brigit
 Lynn Cartwright as Mrs. Woodson
 Albert Szabo as Professor Fromawitz
 David Jolliffe as Tongue
 Miguel Ferrer as Dragon
 Sherri Stoner as Suzy
 Sarah G. Buxton as Cathy
 Joyce Jameson as Mary Asquith 
 Shecky Greene as Master of Ceremonies
 Gary Morgan as Cafeteria Attendant
 Marguerite Kimberley as Bathtub Girl
 Kelley Jean Browser as The Ventriloquist
 Michael Lloyd as Lloyd Sidewalk
 Paul Valentine as Mr. Van Der Meer
 Conrad E. Palmisano as Motorcycle Officer #1
 Robert Fiacco as Motorcycle Officer #2
 James Trenton as Disk Jockey 
 Ernest Robinson as Porno Spectator
 Aimée Eccles as Nisei

References

External links 
 
 
 

1984 comedy films
1984 films
TriStar Pictures films
Films directed by Rod Amateau
American comedy films
1980s English-language films
1980s American films